Vinca ispartensis is a species of flowering plant first identified in Isparta Province, Turkey. Its discovery was first published in 2015. The specific epithet ispartensis indicates its place of discovery, with its etymology being 'ispart' + 'ensis'; the first half is derived from Isparta, and the latter half is Latin for "originating in".

Vinca ispartensis is a subshrub (a type of dwarf plant with a woody base) which dies back to its roots in the winter. It grows in rocky soil, including that rich in minerals containing calcium carbonate.

References

ispartensis
Flora of Turkey